The 2002–03 Australian Athletics Championships was the 81st edition of the national championship in outdoor track and field for Australia. It was held from 3–6 April 2003 at the Queensland Sport and Athletics Centre in Brisbane. It served as a selection meeting for Australia at the 2003 World Championships in Athletics. Long-distance events were held separately: the 5000 metres took place at the Melbourne Track Classic on 1 March 2003 while the 10,000 metres was contested at 12 April 2003 in Runaway Bay, Queensland.

Medal summary

Men

Women

References

External links 
 Athletics Australia website

2003
Australian Athletics Championships
Australian Championships
Athletics Championships
Sports competitions in Brisbane
2000s in Brisbane